Anibal Vicente Argüello (born in Asunción, Paraguay) is a Paraguayan goal keeper.

Career

Lower-tiers
In 2003, Argüello played for Atlántida Asunción. In the 2006 season at Sport Colombia, Argüello played with future national team midfielders Marcelo Estigarribia and Victor Ayala. In 2007, Argüello joined Fernando de la Mora. He remained at the club for the following season.

General Caballero ZC

2009–2011: División Intermedia and promotion to Primera División
In 2009, Argüello shared the General Caballero ZC first-team list with midfielders Aldo Paniagua, Hugo Jazmin and Uranium Pereira.

For the 2010 season, Argüello shared the team with Brazilian midfielder Uranio Pereira and Japanese midfielder Junpei Shinmura. In 2010, he won the División Intermedia with General Caballero.

In the 2011 season, Argüello shared the goal keeping position at General Caballero ZC with Arístides Florentín. Argüello appeared in games during the 2011 Torneo Apertura and during the 2011 Torneo Clausura. All of his appearances in the Torneo Clausura came in September. In the 2011 Primera División Paraguaya season, Arguello amassed 13 appearances. He started in all of the 13 games played. He amassed 1 yellow card in 1, 170 minutes of game time.

On 29 January, he made his first appearance of the 2011 Primera División Paraguaya season in a 2–0 away victory against Libertad. On 12 February, Arguello goalkeeped in a 3–1 away defeat against Olimpia Asunción, receiving goals from Juan Carlos Ferreyra and Pablo Zeballos. On 28 April, Arguello played in a 3–1 home defeat against Nacional Asunción, receiving three first half goals from Ariel Bogado.

On 28 September 2011, Argüello made his last appearance for the 2011 season in a 4–2 defeat to Cerro Porteño.

Lower-tiers
In 2013, Argüello played for Resistencia Sport Club in the División Intermedia. In 2014, he played for Paranaense in the División Intermedia and was coached by Esteban Molinas. In 2015, Argüello again played for Resistencia.

References

External links
 
 Anibal Argüello at Playmaker
 
 
 

Paraguayan footballers
1977 births
Living people
Association football goalkeepers
General Caballero Sport Club footballers